Vicente de las Mercedes Herrera Zeledón (A.K.A. Jamón) (20 January 1821 – 10 November 1888) was President of Costa Rica from 30 July 1876 to 11 September 1877. He came to power in the coup d'état that deposed President Aniceto Esquivel and resigned in favor of Gen. Tomás Guardia the following year.

Biography 
He was the son of José Cleto Herrera Salazar (born 1798–1880) and Antonia Zeledón Masís (born in 1854). He graduated in philosophy in 1839 at the Teaching House of St. Thomas in San José, Costa Rica, and in May 1846 he moved to Guatemala, where he obtained in 1849 the title of doctor of law at the University of San Carlos Borromeo. He passed the bar in Costa Rica on 20 May 1850. He married on 18 December 1853 with Guadalupe Gutiérrez García, daughter of Atanasio Gutiérrez y Lizaurzábal, president of the Superior Court of Justice of Costa Rica from 1832 to 1833, and María of Pilar García Ramírez, and with her had three children: Angélica, Vicente and Mercedes Herrera Gutiérrez.

Ideology 
His ideology was characterized by its conservative and doctrinal positions related to the thinking of the Catholic Church, especially in education. He was President of the Board of Charity of San José, Notary Major of the Ecclesiastical Curia and Secretary of the Cabildo of the Diocese of Costa Rica.

References 

1821 births
1888 deaths
People from San José, Costa Rica
Presidents of Costa Rica
Vice presidents of Costa Rica
Leaders who took power by coup
19th-century Costa Rican people